Laphria winnemana is a species of robber flies in the family Asilidae.

References

winnemana
Articles created by Qbugbot
Insects described in 1919